Little Mitton is a civil parish in the Ribble Valley district, in the county of Lancashire, England. In 2001 the population of the civil parish of Little Mitton was 42, but by the time of the census 2011 population details had been absorbed in the civil parish of Great Mitton.  Little Mitton has a grade II* listed house called Mitton Hall. There is also Little Mitton Hall in Little Mitton.

Governance

In 1935, the civil parish of Little Mitton was created following the abolition the civil parish of Little Mitton, Henthorn and Coldcoats. The detached area of Coldcoats was transferred to Pendleton. That civil parish had been created from the township (in the ancient parish of Whalley) with the same name in 1866.

See also 

 Listed buildings in Little Mitton

References

External links 

 holtancestry.co.uk
 genuki.org.uk
 littlemilton.org.uk
 nationalarchives.gov.uk
 britishlistedbuildings.co.uk
 neighbourhood.statistics.gov.uk
 minimap

Geography of Ribble Valley
Civil parishes in Lancashire